Vox Novus is a New York City-based organization consisting of composers, musicians, and music enthusiasts which presents and supports new music. Vox Novus was founded by Robert Voisey to promote contemporary composers in 2000.

This organization was created for the purposes of expanding the presence of contemporary music in the public's vision, empowering composers and contemporary musicians to create, produce, and promote their music. Vox Novus does this by the production of concerts, exposure on the Internet, and facilitating networking between professionals. Vox Novus promotes and produces contemporary music using repeatable methods and models that composers can take and use on their own. This way contemporary music can reach an ever wider audience thereby continuing the advancement of culture and art.

Vox Novus has produced and promoted more than 500 concerts in over 30 countries around the world. The organization is most noted for its 60x60 project, the Composer's Voice Concert Series, and Fifteen-Minutes-of-Fame music project. Vox Novus has several other project endeavors such as Circuit Bridges, New Nodes, and xMV.

Vox Novus supports many other new music projects through its advocacy. It has engaged in several endeavors to promote and empower composers and their music in presentations of the greater cultural community.

One example is to produce a call for scores of new works written to celebrate the West Point Band's bicentennial for a concert in honor of Armed Forces Day.

Another project is a concert of music by living Armenian composers to commemorate the Armenian genocide centennial.

It is also known for its resources for composers: Composers' Site, Music Avatar, NM421, and the American Composer Timeline.

In 2015, Vox Novus celebrated its 15-year anniversary with a festival that included all of the concert series it produced: 60x60, Composer's Voice Concert Series, Fifteen-Minutes-of-Fame, Circuit Bridges, and xMV. Two Composer's Voice concerts with Fifteen-Minutes-of-Fame took place at Symphony Space in New York City.

Performance Programs

60x60
60x60 is an artistic project comprising 60 one-minute performances. The project commemorates its origins each year by producing a one-hour electroacoustic/acousmatic music concert. 60x60 has been presented in venues and festivals throughout the world. 60x60 has also collaborated with dance and video.

Since its inception in 2003, 60x60 has presented and promoted the works of thousands of composers in more than 50 mixes.  Collaborating in many different media formats such as video and dance, 60x60 has been presented hundreds of performances in more than 40 countries and has been presented in venues such as the Winter Garden Atrium in New York City, Stratford Circus in London, the Contemporary Art Museum of Chicago, and HEC-TV in St Louis.

The project has received critical acclaim from New York Times, Time Out (magazine), as well as other publication throughout the globe.

Composer's Voice concert series
The Composer's Voice Concert Series is a chamber concert series produced primarily in New York City.  Started in 2001, the concert series was nomadic and presented in several locations in New York City including: Elebash Hall, Collective Unconscious, Under St. Marks, and South Oxford Space in Brooklyn. "On the whole, the programming for this chamber concert demonstrated that Vox Novus, with its beautifully appointed and acoustically pleasing chamber salon, offers a significant venue just a short distance from the Brooklyn Academy of Music for the presentation of serious works by established and emerging composers. Those voices should be heard, and they can even be reheard on the Vox Novus website (http://www.VoxNovus.com) that generously offers complete audio recordings and even full scores of works presented by Vox Novus at its concerts."

From 2007 to 2015, the concert series was co-produced with the Remarkable Theater Brigade at Jan Hus Church on the Upper East Side in New York City. Concerts at Jan Hus were presented on a monthly basis and bi-weekly since 2011.

Since 2016, Composer's Voice concerts have been held at The Firehouse Space in Brooklyn.

Besides New York City, Composer's Voice has been presented in collaboration with other organizations for performances in Birmingham, Alabama; Buenos Aires, Argentina; Boston, Massachusetts; Rio de Janeiro, Brazil; as well as, Bucharest and Constanta in Romania. The series has presented over 100 performances.

The series presented works by several notable composers performed by performance groups throughout the world.

Fifteen-Minutes-of-Fame
Fifteen-Minutes-of-Fame is a music project which contains fifteen one-minute works by different composers which are specifically written for a specific musician and or ensemble. This project was originated by Vox Novus, of which called for, collected, selected, and presented 15 varied one-minute acoustic miniatures. The 15 selections are composed for a specific artist or chamber ensemble and then debuted on the Composer's Voice Concert Series. The project seeks one-minute music miniatures from composers working in any style and aesthetic. "Este concepto de las miniaturas se ajusta muy bien a nuestra 'era del zapping'" (This concept of miniatures fits very well with our 'age of zapping')

A call for scores is announced, and 15 pieces are chosen from the works submitted. The works are then performed on the Composer's Voice Concert Series in New York City. The concept started at a celebratory concert in 2009 for the birthday of Robert Voisey, the founder of Vox Novus and the 60x60 project.

The presentation of fifteen works in a short time allows works of many composers who would not normally be included in a chamber concert to be played. "The brief time limit is also a catalyst for experimentation: when the pressure is off to develop or sustain a composition the pressure is on to make what little time you have very interesting."

Musicians
Fifteen-Minutes-of-Fame gives the interpreter an opportunity to have many one-minute miniatures specifically written for them. This is done through a call by Vox Novus for works, sent to composer contacts around the world. A selection process ensues at the call deadline and the musician chooses 15 works as a set to perform. It gives the musician an opportunity to pick from a variety of aesthetics and styles written by different composers that they have never met before; Fifteen Minutes of Fame promotes community and fosters professional relationships.
 
Musicians who have participated in Fifteen Minutes of Fame include Austin Mandolin Orchestra, Bruce Curlette, Shiau-uen Ding, Beth Griffith, Kenji Haba, Craig Hultgren, Conway Kuo, Cornelia PetroiuJenny Ribeiro, Alyssa Reit, Peter Reit,Juan Maria Solare, SoundProof Thomas Piercy, Claudine Hickman, Poné Ensemble, Alex Sramek, West Point Woodwind Quintet, New Thread Quartet, Sophia Yan, West Point Band, WestvPoint Woodwind Quintet, and Zentripetal.

Shiau-uen Ding premiered the first official Fifteen-Minutes-of-Fame on March 27, 2011.

Sophia Yan performed the first Fifteen-Minutes-of-Fame with selection from composers under the age of fifteen. The participants selected for the concert ranged in ages from 3 to 15 years old. One of the composers selected Emma Liddle, age 13, was profiled in The Bloomington Crow for her participation in the Fifteen Minutes of Fame selection.

Craig Hultgren's performance was praised for his "herculean effort to shift styles and sensibilities at a moment's notice."

"Fifteen-Minutes-of-Fame" presented an anthology of one-minute pieces, written for the Poné Ensemble, that whet the appetite with mini-samples of a cornucopia of their talent, tastes and styles. - James F Cotter, Times Herald-Record April 29, 2014 

For the fifteenth anniversary of 9/11, the West Point Band premiered fifteen one-minute works that honor the contributions of those men and women at Trinity Church in New York City.
The following 15 composers’ works represent this Fifteen-Minutes-of-Fame for this performance include: James Anderson, David Avshalomov, Sy Brandon, Steve Cohen, Harrison J. Collins, Cindi Hsu, Nicholas Ryan Kelly, George David Kieffer, Alan Kinningham, Anthony O'Toole, David R. Peoples, James Peterson, Bradley Sampson, Richard G. Smith, and R. Andrew Yates.

Composers
Fifteen-Minutes-of-Fame give the opportunity to have their work performed by adventurous musicians specifically looking to champion new music. While a constraint, the one-minute miniature format allows for the composer to write a short composition with greater ease than a longer work. Fifteen Minutes of Fame encourages experimentation and opportunities to write for instrumentation that are not commonly available. With the significantly larger number of works selected being 15 and the frequency Fifteen Minutes of Fame is produced, it becomes a huge resource for composers to have their work played and receive greater exposure.

The one-minute miniatures for Fifteen-Minutes-of-Fame are written by composers from all over the globe. Fifteen Minutes of Fame has presented more than 100 composers including Dennis Bathory-Kitsz, Joshua Barlage, John Bilotta, Scott Brickman, Carson Cooman, Salim Dada, Emma Lou Diemer, Bobby DeLisle, Matthew Van Dongen, Moritz Eggert, Francesco Di Fiore, Arthur Gottschalk, Emma Liddel, David Morneau, Serban Nichifor, James Soe Nyun, Michael Mikulka, Nova Pon, Nolan Stolz, Edward Strauman, and David Wolfson.

Contemporary Quartets
The Contemporary Quartets Project is a new music production project born in the middle of the COVID pandemic. The idea is to find composers who are interested in producing the quartets that they have created and then have a live recording made online. 
Starting in 2021, Vox Novus in conjunction with Virtual Concert Halls bring this new way to produce contemporary String Quartets to composers around the world.

Contemporary Quartets produces and presents the compositions of living composers. The project current features the talents of the Argus Quartet, Lehner String Quartet, and RUSQUARTET.

Circuit Bridges
Circuit Bridges is an electro-acoustic concert series designed to present and promote the electro-acoustic music. The series does this by creating "bridge" concerts between communities, organizations, or ensembles. "The heart of our mission is to connect electronic music composers and communities and share our music." Circuit Bridges is dedicated to highlighting the community of electroacoustic music creators."

XMV eXperimental Music Video
XMV was and experimental music video night hosted in New York with Collective:Unconscious XMV was designed to present artists experimenting with video and music; from shorts to features, from psychedelic to abstract imagery, from minimalism to edgy pop, and even live performances and dynamic video.

Resources for Composers

Composers' Site
Composers' Site is a free online database of composer opportunities. It allows for composers to quickly and efficiently search for opportunities like contests, competitions, residencies, and calls-for-works. Composers can also sign up to the mailing list to receive notifications on new and expiring opportunities.

Music Avatar
Music Avatar is an online tool to accept, process, and judge music submissions online. Vox Novus uses Music Avatar to process submissions for its Fifteen-Minutes-Minutes-of-Fame, Composer's Voice Concert Series, Circuit Bridges, and 60x60. Music Avatar is also used by the greater music community for its calls: such as the Society of Composers, Inc and Armenian General Benevolent Union (AGBU)   The Music Avatar was instrumental in administering "The Sayat Nova International Composition Competition" run by the Armenian General Benevolent Union (AGBU).

American Composer Timeline
Started in 2000, the American Composer Timeline was Vox Novus' first contemporary music initiative. Its purpose was to highlight the tradition of composition in the United States from it very first beginnings of the formation of the colonies until contemporary times. It boasts more than 1300 composer listings with links to their biographies and more detailed information.

Articles & reviews
 Concert showcases experimental music by Sabrina Hayes - The MSU Exponent, February 26, 2015
Austin Mandolin Orchestra Premieres 15 New Pieces By Joel Hobbs Mandolin Cafe - February 1, 2015 - 1:15 pm

Craig Hultgren's well-earned 15 minutes of fame unfolding at Moonlight on the Mountain in Birmingham By Michael Huebner, AL.com, May 21, 2013 
D.M. composer's 60-second work receives New York premiere by Michael Morain, Des Moines Register Jul 13, 2012
A Parhelion sighting in Queens, Part 2 - Seth Gilman, New York Music Culture Examiner
Seleccionados los 15 tangos en miniatura para Juan Solare en Bremen Argentina Es Tango, July 10, 2012
13-Year-Old Composer is Chosen for Fifteen Minutes of Fame By Gina Szafraniec, The Bloomington Crow September 1, 2011
Gone in 60 Minutes: Electronic Compositions Showcased at NC State University, Alexandra Jones, "Classical Voice in North Carolina", October 1, 2007.
WRITERS' BLOCK, Chris Pasles, Los Angeles Times, July 22, 2007Time and Motion, Anne Cammon, "Fly Global Music Culture", May 26, 2007
60x60 Project presents 60 composers in 60 minutes, Rachel Slade, North Texas Daily February 28, 2007 Accessed May 1, 2007October 20, 2002 Composer's Voice Concert, John de Clef Pineiro, New Music Connoisseur, March 2003 Vol.11 No.1
"El argentino Solare promueve la expansión del tango más allá de sus fronteras", Carlos Gallardo Ruig, ExpressNews'' Nr. 645, London, August 2012.

References

External links
 Vox Novus
 60x60
 Composer's Voice concert series
 Fifteen-Minutes-of-Fame
 Composers' Site
 Music Avatar
 American Composer Timeline
 XMV eXperimental Music Video

Music organizations based in the United States
New music organizations
Contemporary music organizations